Laq'a Jawira (Aymara laq'a earth (soil), jawira river, "earth river"; hispanicized spellings: Laca Jahuira / Lacajahuira) is a river in Bolivia which runs from Lake Poopó. Its length is entirely within the territory of Oruro Department.

It runs from the extreme south-west of the lake, and heads west-south-west. It has a length of 135 kilometres, after which it is lost in the salar de Coipasa.

Its waters are salty at the point at which it meets the lake.

See also

List of rivers of Bolivia

References

Rand McNally, The New International Atlas, 1993.

Laqa Jawira